Platysticta secreta is a species of damselfly in the family Platystictidae. It is endemic to wet zone forests of Hasalaka area, Sri Lanka.

References

 List of odonates of Sri Lanka

Damselflies of Sri Lanka
Insects described in 2016